Sclerurus is a bird genus in the ovenbird family, Furnariidae. Members of this genus are commonly known as leaftossers or leafscrapers, and are found in Mexico, Central America and South America. They are close relatives of the miners (Geositta), which are essentially an open-country version of the leaftossers, being lighter in color and longer-legged. Other relatives might include the sharp-tailed streamcreeper of the monotypic genus Lochmias and some other Furnariidae of obscure relationships.

Species
The genus contains seven species:

References

External links

 
Bird genera
Taxonomy articles created by Polbot